The 1996 Leekes British Open Squash Championships was held at the Welsh Institute of Sport with the later stages being held at the Cardiff International Arena in Cardiff from 1–7 April 1996. The event was won by Michelle Martin for the fourth consecutive year defeating Sarah Fitzgerald in the final.

Seeds

Draw and results

Qualifying round

First round

Second round

Quarter-finals

Semi-finals

Final

References

Women's British Open Squash Championships
Squash in Wales
Sports competitions in Cardiff
Women's British Open Squash Championship
1990s in Cardiff
Women's British Open Squash Championship
1996 in women's squash
Squ